Albu Afri (also Romanized as Ālbū ‘Afrī; also known as Ālbū ‘Afrī-ye Shomālī) is a village in Howmeh-ye Gharbi Rural District, in the Central District of Dasht-e Azadegan County, Khuzestan Province, Iran. At the 2006 census, its population was 758, in 110 families.

References 

Populated places in Dasht-e Azadegan County